Calla is a 1999 South Korean romance film about a man who travels back in time to save the girl he loves from getting killed. Directed by Song Hae-sung, it stars Song Seung-heon and Kim Hee-sun.

Plot
Every morning, Sun-woo receives a calla lily with a musical note attached to it, and he wants to find out who his secret admirer is. One day he meets the beautiful Ji-hee on the bus and connects her with the daily anonymous gift when he notices the same music from the musical note coming from the flower shop she works at. He falls in love with her at first sight, thinking she is the one who is sending him flowers. Wanting to confess his feelings for her, he asks her out on a date at a local hotel, and she agrees. At the hotel, though, he arrives to find Ji-hee taken hostage, and, to his horror, tragically murdered before his eyes.

Three years later, Sun-woo is soon to be married, but he is haunted by the memories of Ji-hee. His desperate wish to revive her magically comes true whereby time is turned back to the day of the fateful date at the hotel. Seeking a chance to save her life, Sun-woo is given 24 hours to turn things around. Through this process Sun-woo realizes that it was Ji-hee's friend Soo-jin and not Ji-hee who sent the calla lilies three years ago. With this, he is transported back to the present, to begin the quest for his true love, Soo-jin.

Cast
Song Seung-heon as Kim Sun-woo
Kim Hee-sun as Kang Ji-hee
Kim Hyun-joo as Yoon Soo-jin 
Choi Cheol-ho as Jung Min-wook
Shin Cheol-jin as Mr. Yeong	
Go Joo-hee as Yoon Mi-ra
Kim Ho-jin as Kim Byung-soo
Jo Jae-gook as Deputy Ma

References

External links
 
 
 

1999 films
Films about time travel
Films directed by Song Hae-sung
South Korean romantic drama films